Non-Commissioned Officer Academy is a college located in Iksan, South Korea.

References

External links
 

Republic of Korea Army
Military academies of South Korea
Universities and colleges in North Jeolla Province
Educational institutions established in 1951
1951 establishments in South Korea